The Longest Penalty Shot in the World, also known as El Penalti más largo del mundo, is a 2005 Spanish comedy film.

Synopsis 

Fernando is a failed football goalkeeper who is finding it hard to find his bread and butter. During the final local league soccer game of the season, goalkeeper Roman (Benito Sagredo) is injured and useless Fernando (Fernando Tejero) steps in to face a last-minute penalty kick. But before it's converted, the unruly crowd spills onto the field preventing the game from continuing, and the referee decrees the penalty must be retaken one week later. With money in the balance and a chance for the team to advance to a more prestigious league, the hitherto unpopular Fernando suddenly finds himself getting kid glove treatment, with team coach Santos (Carlos Kaniowsky) even arranging a date with Roman's reluctant girlfriend Cecilia (Marta Larralde), whom Fernando fancies.

Cast 
 Fernando Tejero – Fernando
 María Botto – Ana
 Marta Larralde – Cecilia
 Carlos Kaniowsky – Santos
 Javier Gutiérrez – Rafa
 Enrique Villén – Adrián
 Fernando Cayo – Bilbao
  – Rodríguez
 Luis Callejo – Khaled
 Cristina Alcázar – Julia
 Benito Sagredo – Román

Production and making 
 
The film was directed by Roberto Santiago who wrote the script and story for the movie as well. The shooting of movie begin in 2004. It was shot in various regions. The film was produced by Mariela Besuievski, Gerardo Herrero and Tadeo Villalba hijo. The music for the movie was given by Lucio Godoy.

Reception 
The movie was released on 9 March 2005 in Spain. It was well received by the audiences, but the critics gave an average rating to the movie.

See also 
 List of Spanish films of 2005

External links
 

2005 films
Spanish sports films
2000s sports films
2000s Spanish films